Kyulyunken is a rural locality in Tomponsky Ulus of the Sakha Republic, Russia.

Rural localities in Tomponsky District